Lincoln's Forgotten Ally: Judge Advocate General Joseph Holt of Kentucky is a biography by Elizabeth D. Leonard about Joseph Holt, a member of US President James Buchanan's administration who was Judge Advocate General of the United States Army.

Awards
It received the Lincoln Prize in 2012.

References

2011 non-fiction books
Biographies about politicians
American biographies